Blair is the name of several communities in the U.S. state of West Virginia.

Blair, Jefferson County, West Virginia
Blair, Logan County, West Virginia